Fatimatou Mint Abdel Malick (born 1958) is a Mauritanian politician who has served as mayor of Tevragh-Zeina since 2001. She was the first woman in her country to hold the position of mayor. From 2012 to 2015 she served as president of The Network for Locally Elected Women of Africa (REFELA).

Early life and education
Abdel Malik was born in 1958 in Tamchakett, where her father was an administrator. She studied computer science in Louvain-la-Neuve, Belgium.

Career
Abdel Malik ran a computer services office, MINFE, in Nouakchott before working as the network administrator for Habitat Bank. She then worked at the Ministry of Urban Planning and Habitat before being appointed to the Prime Minister's Office.

In 2001, Abdel Malick was asked to run for municipal office by the then Democratic and Social Republican Party, and she was elected mayor of Tevragh-Zeina, one of the nine communes of the Nouakchott Urban Community. She was the first woman to serve as a mayor in Mauritania. She has improved school education, particularly for girls, and reformed the administration. She was re-elected in 2006, 2011 and 2015.

From 2012 until December 2015, Abdel Malick served as the president of the Network for Locally Elected Women of Africa. The network, formed in Tangier in March 2011, brings together women elected in local government positions. Abdel Malick has travelled throughout Mauritania to support female candidates for office and has seen five more women join her as mayors, including Maty Mint Hamady.

Awards and honours
 United Nations International Strategy for Disaster Reduction "Champion for Resilience" 2013
 Knight of Honour of the Republic of the Congo 2013
 FAO Medal 2015

Personal life
Abdel Malick is a single mother to three children. She is a Muslim.

References

External links
 Ford Foundation interview

Living people
1958 births
21st-century Mauritanian women politicians
21st-century Mauritanian politicians
Mayors of places in Mauritania
Women mayors of places in Mauritania
Republican Party for Democracy and Renewal politicians
People from Hodh El Gharbi Region